The 2007 SEABA Championship for Women was held in Phuket, Thailand from October 14 to October 20. The Philippines swept all of their assignments in the elimination round and beat Indonesia in the semifinals, but Thailand beat them in the championship match to clinch their fourth title.

Elimination round

Round robin

Medal round

Semifinals

Bronze-medal match

Gold-medal match

Final standings

Awards

External links
 Summary

2007
International women's basketball competitions hosted by Thailand
2007 in women's basketball
2007–08 in Asian basketball
2007–08 in Philippine basketball
2007–08 in Malaysian basketball
2007–08 in Indonesian basketball
2007–08 in Singaporean basketball
2007–08 in Thai basketball